Alejandro González Jr. (March 8, 1993 – December 9, 2016) was a Mexican professional boxer who challenged once for the IBF super bantamweight title. He was the son of former world champion Alejandro Martín González.

Professional career
Between 2010 and 2016, Gonzalez Jr. compiled a 25-3-3 professional record. In February 2013 González knocked out 19-0 Hanzel Martinez in the second round in Tijuana to win the interim WBC Youth Silver bantamweight title, the only title he would win in his 31 bout career. In July 2015, Gonzalez Jr. knocked down 20-0 International Boxing Federation World Super Bantamweight Champion Carl Frampton twice in the first round of their world title bout, only to lose the 12-round decision. In his final ring appearance, Gonzalez Jr. had not won a fight in nearly two years when he fought to a 12-round draw with Hector Bobadilla  in Guadalajara in October 2016 in a bout for the interim World Boxing Council FECOMBOX Super Bantamweight 
title.

Death
González was shot to death in Guadalajara, Mexico, on December 9, 2016. Two others accompanying González in a Jeep van were killed, and one was believed to be his grandfather. ESPN Mexico called the shooting an execution.

Professional boxing record

See also
Notable boxing families

References

External links

1993 births
2016 deaths
Boxers from Jalisco
Deaths by firearm in Mexico
Featherweight boxers
Mexican male boxers
Sportspeople from Guadalajara, Jalisco